Acrothamnus spathaceus, also known as the mountain beard-heath, is a shrub or small tree up to  high. Known from two populations. One in tropical Queensland. Also known in the McPherson Range on the border with New South Wales, as far south as Numinbah Nature Reserve. The habitat is montane rainforests and their margins.

References

Epacridoideae
Ericales of Australia
Flora of New South Wales
Plants described in 1990
Flora of Queensland